Fleet vehicles are motor vehicles owned or leased by a business, government agency, or other organisation rather than by an individual or family. Typical examples include vehicles operated by car rental companies, taxicab companies, public utilities, public bus companies, and police departments. Many businesses purchase or lease fleet vehicles to deliver goods to customers, as well as providing vehicles for sales representatives to travel to clients. In some jurisdictions and countries, fleet vehicles can also be privately owned by employees. These vehicles are called the 'grey fleet'  and are used for work purposes. Fleet vehicles can be managed by a fleet manager or transport manager using fleet management software. Vehicles may be connected to a fleet telematics system by way of a Fleet Management System, also known as an FMS.

Federal Vehicle Fleet

In the United States, "Federal Vehicle Fleet" refers to the federal government's vehicles.

Fleet leasing in the UK is very much the same as in the US; business van leasing is popular in the construction industry as an important asset. Fleet leasing is popular with much larger businesses with the ability to multi-lease vehicles for a discount.

See also 

Corporate car sharing
Fleet card
Fleet management software
Fleet Management System
Fleet Special
Take-home vehicle
Vehicle re-marketing

References 

Car rental
Commercial vehicles